Roger Rohatgi (born 19 May in Houston, Texas) is an American independent film producer and screenwriter, motivational speaker, actor and ordained minister focusing on youth and college-aged audiences. On April 24, 2004, he was fully ordained as a Christian nondenominational minister by Vision Ministries International based in Columbus, OH. He won his first independent film award on October 16, 2005, for the film Waterwalker, at the Bare Bones International Film Festival in Tulsa, OK. Waterwalker received top honors, winning "Best-of-Fest", for the mini-feature category of the festival. Roger was featured as a guest on Good Day Tulsa ABC on November 2, 2005. (Other notable guests on the show were Nicholas Sparks, author of The Notebook). The Atoka County Times reported on April 27, 2005 that "Waterwalker is a chapter in Rohatgi's career. A student of film-making, he is also an actor and director, with several independent careers to his credit. Rohatgi is an emerging force in Hollywood and New York, at the same time at home in Atoka." He has also been featured on many other TV and radio shows. He hosted/emceed the first two episodes of a national stand-up comedy TV show on American Life Network and FamilyNet TV called "LOL". Roger hosted the national show Trailerific on Youtoo TV in 2012-13.
 
Roger's father was born in Delhi, India, and mother born in Monterrey, Mexico. Roger married his wife, Heather, on February 14, 2006 in Houston, TX at Minute Maid Park broadcast on Sunny 99.1fm KODA (Clear Channel Radio).

Filmography 
 Generation (Documentary) (1997) Mars Hill Productions: commentator, actor
 Waterwalker (2005): producer, writer, co-director, lead actor

Television 
 The Dennis Rogers Show (2007) : co-writer, co-host, character actor
 LOL Comedy Show American Life Network and FamilyNet TV (2010) : host, comedian 
 Trailerific Youtoo TV (2012-2013) : host, comedian

Radio 
 TheBlast.FM: voice imaging
 Lightforce Radio KSBJ 89.3 FM (Houston, TX): radio dJ
 John & Denny Show FLN Radio 90.9 FM (East Coast): on-air guest, comedic Relief
 Powersource Radio KWCJ.com (Former Web-station): radio dJ

Media appearances 
 Fox
 ABC
 TBN
 DAYSTAR
 MXTV
 Public Access Community Television (PACT)
 American Life Network (ALN)
 FamilyNet Television
 Youtoo TV

References

External links 
 Official Website
 Waterwalker Movie
 theBlast.FM
 
 ELEMENTUM STUDIOS

Year of birth missing (living people)
Living people
American motivational speakers
American Christian clergy
American people of Indian descent
American businesspeople